This is a list of films produced in Pakistan in 1996 (see 1996 in film) and in the Urdu language.

1996

See also
1996 in Pakistan

External links
 Search Pakistani film - IMDB.com

1996
Pakistani
Films